

Events
Gui de Cavalhon and Raymond VI of Toulouse composed a tenso while on their way to the Fourth Lateran Council

Works published

Births
 Guido delle Colonne (died 1290) Sicilian writer, in Latin
 Meir of Rothenburg (died 1293), German rabbi and poet, a major author of the tosafot on Rashi's commentary on the Talmud

Deaths
 Giraut de Bornelh (born 1138), French troubadour whose his skill earned him the nickname of "Master of the Troubadours"

See also

Poetry
 List of years in poetry

13th-century poetry
Poetry